The giant sharkminnow (Osteochilus schlegelii) a species of cyprinid fish found in southeast Asia.

The name honors Hermann Schlegel (10 June 1804 – 17 January 1884) who was a German ornithologist, herpetologist and ichthyologist.

References

Taxa named by Pieter Bleeker
Fish described in 1851
Osteochilus